Vivian Davis Figures (born January 24, 1957) is an American politician who is a Democratic member of the Alabama Senate, representing the 33rd District in Mobile County since she was elected on January 28, 1997, to serve the remaining term of her late husband, Senator Michael Figures, who was the President pro tempore of the Alabama Senate. She was re-elected without opposition in 1998 and 2002.

Early life and career
Figures graduated from Williamson High School in Mobile, Alabama, and earned a Bachelor of Science in Management Science from the University of New Haven in Connecticut. She put herself through college by working at Yale University, and in a family owned grocery. She was attending the Thomas Goode Jones School of Law in Montgomery, Alabama, when her husband's death forced her to discontinue her legal education. Figures has three sons. Her youngest, Jelani, played basketball on scholarship for Morehouse College from 2007 to 2011.

Figures is President/CEO of Figures Legacy Education Foundation and serves on the board of directors of the Mobile Area Education Foundation.  She is a past at-large member of the Democratic National Committee.  She was initiated in the Delta Theta Omega chapter of Alpha Kappa Alpha sorority in 2002.

Political career
Figures was elected to the Mobile City Council in 1993. In that capacity, she was known as a staunch community advocate. Early in her council career, she led the opposition to a proposed facility for burning petroleum-contaminated oil near downtown Mobile. As a council member, Figures was also the initial proponent of naming Mobile's new minor league baseball park for home run legend Hank Aaron, a Mobile native.

Following her husband's death in 1996, Figures ran for his seat in the Alabama Senate. She earned the most votes in the first round of the Democratic Party's primary election, with 47 percent, but missed the majority needed to avoid a runoff election. She defeated James Buskey in the runoff, before defeating Republican Gregory Ramos to win election to the state senate, and was sworn into office in January 1997. In the Alabama Senate, Figures serves as the chairwoman of the Education and Mobile County Local Legislation Committees. In the legislature, Figures may be best known as the perennial sponsor of a bill to ban smoking in indoor, public places statewide in Alabama. In the 2008 general session, the bill passed the Senate, was believed to have sufficient support to pass the House, and Governor Bob Riley had indicated he would sign it. The bill died when legislative filibusters prevented a final vote in the House. Figures was also instrumental in the passage of economic incentives that were critical in the location of a Thyssen-Krupp steel plant near Mobile.

Figures was the Democratic nominee for the United States Senate seat that was held by Republican Jeff Sessions in the 2008 election, after winning the June 2008 Democratic primary with 64% of the vote. Aaron campaigned for Figures and hosted fundraisers in several Alabama cities. On November 4, she was defeated by Sessions with 37% of the vote to Sessions's 63%.

In November 2012, Alabama Senate Democrats selected Figures to be their floor leader for the next two year term. She became the first woman to lead either the majority or minority party in either house of the Alabama Legislature.

In April 2019, Davis Figures announced that she would run to be the chair of the Alabama Democratic Party. She dropped out of the race in June.

Davis Figures led the opposition to a bill restricting abortion, with a penalty of 99 years imprisonment for any doctor performing an abortion, and no exceptions for rape or incest. She proposed an amendment outlawing vasectomies, arguing that "there’s no law on the books anywhere in this country that mandate[s] what a man can and can’t do with his body, yet for us there are a number of them."

In 2021, Davis Figures' house in Toulminville, Alabama, was attacked by an unknown assailant. 23 shots were fired into her home, but there were no injuries as the house was empty at the time.

References

External links

Alabama State Legislature – Senator Vivian Davis Figures official government website
Vivian Davis Figures official U.S. Senate campaign website
 
Follow the Money – Vivian Davis Figures
2006 2002 1998 campaign contributions

1957 births
20th-century American politicians
20th-century American women politicians
21st-century American politicians
21st-century American women politicians
African-American state legislators in Alabama
African-American women in politics
Alabama city council members
Democratic Party Alabama state senators
Candidates in the 2008 United States elections
Living people
Politicians from Mobile, Alabama
University of New Haven alumni
Women city councillors in Alabama
Women state legislators in Alabama
Yale University staff
African-American city council members in Alabama
20th-century African-American women
20th-century African-American politicians
21st-century African-American women
21st-century African-American politicians